Noisette (which means hazelnut in French) can refer to:
 A small round piece of lean meat, especially lamb
 Beurre noisette, browned butter used in cooking
 Sauce noisette, a type of Hollandaise sauce made with browned butter
 A chocolate made with hazelnuts
 Louis Claude Noisette, a French botanist
 La Noisette, a former restaurant in London
 Noisettes, a British musical group 
 Noisette, a 2000 album by Soft Machine
 The Noisette Rose, a variety of garden rose
 A short black coffee with a small amount of milk froth added
 Les Noisettes, or The Nut Gatherers, a painting by William-Adolphe Bouguereau